The 2007 Yemen tourist attack was a suicide car bomb attack on Spanish tourists visiting the Queen of Sheba temple in Marib, Marib Governorate on July 2, 2007.

Details
A member of Al-Qaeda rammed an explosive-laden car into a tourist convoy killing 8 Spanish tourists, 2 Yemeni drivers, and injuring 12.

Aftermath
On August 8, four militants died in a Yemeni security forces raid near Mareb, one of them Kassem al-Raimi, who was the top Al-Qaeda operative who masterminded the attacks. Raimi was involved in other operations and was one of 13 convicted prisoners who escaped from a Sanaa prison in 2006.

See also
List of terrorist incidents, 2007
2008 attack on tourists in Yemen

References

External links
Warvictims.wordpresscom

2007 murders in Yemen
Attacks on tourists in Asia
July 2007 events in Asia
Marib Governorate
Mass murder in 2007
Terrorist incidents in Yemen in 2007
Terrorist incidents attributed to al-Qaeda in the Arabian Peninsula
Spain–Yemen relations
Suicide car and truck bombings in Yemen